I Love Me is a 2012 Indian Malayalam thriller film directed by B. Unnikrishnan and written by Sethu. It stars Unni Mukundan, Asif Ali, Isha Talwar, with Anoop Menon and Kadambari Jethwani in supporting role. The film was shot in Vietnam, Bangkok and Kochi and was produced by Vaishak Rajan under the banner Vyshakha Cinemas. The film features a score and soundtrack composed by Deepak Dev. It is the first film directed by Unnikrishnan thar he did not write the script for.

Plot
Ram Mohan, a high-profile businessman, brings two criminals - Xavi and Prem - from Kochi to Bangkok to kill a person, so that Ram can save his sinking business empire. The situation gets complicated when Samantha, a young lady enters the equation and Ram Mohan wants that Xavi and Prem have to kill each other.

Cast
 Unni Mukundan as Xavi
 Asif Ali as Prem
 Anoop Menon as Ram Mohan
 Isha Talwar as Samantha
 Kadambari Jethwani as Susan 
 Rupa Manjari as Sameera
 Junaid Sheikh as Albert Lawrence
 Biju Pappan as Maniyappan
 Shine Tom Chacko as Puyol
 Indrans as Alves
 Joju George as Chacko
 Sinosh Ekkilissery as Eto'o

Production
The film was written by Sethu and directed by B. Unnikrishnan; it is the first film directed by him that he did not write the script for. Explaining the reasons for his decision, he says: "That is because I enjoyed the story that Sethu narrated to me. Moreover, I was looking for an opportunity to work with young actors and this script seemed just right for such an outing. Writing and directing can be tedious and time-consuming and I wanted to take a break from the responsibility of doing both." The film was shot in Vietnam, Bangkok, and Kochi.

Reception
Veeyen of Nowrunning.com gave the film a negative rating of 2/5 and stated, "at a time when novel themes and experiments are filling our screens, this one just doesn't impress".

References

External links
 

2012 films
2010s Malayalam-language films
2012 thriller films
Indian thriller films
Films shot in Kochi
Films shot in Bangkok
Films shot in Vietnam
Films directed by B. Unnikrishnan